P. V. Narasimha Bharathi (24 March 1924 - 11 May 1978) was an Indian actor. He acted in Ponmudi, directed by Ellis R. Dungan. TMS was searching for cine playback singer to enter. P. V. Narasimha Bharathi who was a friend of T. M. Soundararajan, acted as a hero in an around 50 movies. He introduced T. M. Soundararajan as a playback singer the film Krishna Vijayam in 1950. Narasimha Bharathi recommended Soundararajan to S. M. Subbaiah Naidu to recognise his talent. S. M. Subbaiah Naidu finally agreed to give Soundararajan a chance. "Krishna Vijayam" and "Penn Kulathin Pon Villaku".

Filmography

References

https://antrukandamugam.wordpress.com/2013/11/30/p-v-narasimha-bharathi/

Male actors in Tamil cinema
1924 births
1978 deaths